Opiki is a small rural settlement in the Horowhenua district of New Zealand's North Island.

Opiki and its surrounds had a population of 522 at the 2013 New Zealand census, an increase of 3 people since the 2006 census. There were 264 males and 261 females. Figures have been rounded and may not add up to totals. 92.6% were European/Pākehā, 7.4% were Māori, 2.5% were Pacific peoples and 3.1% were Asian.

The New Zealand Ministry for Culture and Heritage gives a translation of "place of climbing" for Ōpiki.

Education

References

Populated places in Manawatū-Whanganui
Populated places on the Manawatū River